Lake Hino (Estonian: Hino järv; also: Pugalo järv, Suur-Pugalo järv, Valgejärv, and Henno järv) is a lake in Rõuge Parish, Võru County, Estonia. It is located near the villages of Hino and Misso.

The lake covers an area of 198.8 ha, which is the largest and most island-rich lake in the Haanja Upland. Its maximum depth is 10.4 m, the average 3.1 m. Lake Hino is located at an altitude 180 meters above sea level.

See also
List of lakes of Estonia

Hino
Rõuge Parish
Lakes of Võru County